The following are the national records in speed skating in Japan maintained by the Japan Skating Federation (KBSF).

Men

Women

References

External links
 Japan Skating Federation web site

National records in speed skating
Records
Speed skating
Speed skating-related lists
Speed skating